Federal elections were held in West Germany on 17 September 1961 to elect the members of the fourth Bundestag. CDU/CSU remained the largest faction, winning 242 of the 499 seats.

Campaign

For the first time, the SPD announced a Chancellor candidate who was not chairman of the party: Willy Brandt, the Governing Mayor of West Berlin. After the building of the Berlin Wall, he gained more and more sympathy, while chancellor Konrad Adenauer was criticised for not showing enough support for the people of West Berlin. Adenauer had to save the absolute majority of CDU and CSU, but, considering his age and his long term as chancellor, there were big doubts if he should lead the country in a fourth term.

Results

Results by state

Constituency seats

List seats

Aftermath 
The absolute majority was lost by the conservative union due to the gains of the liberal FDP under Erich Mende. From 1961 on, the Union, SPD and FDP established an electoral "triopoly" in the Bundestag that would last until 1983.

Konrad Adenauer remained Chancellor, building a coalition between the CDU/CSU-FDP. In 1962 he had to announce a fifth cabinet: The FDP had temporarily left the coalition after the secretary of defense, Franz Josef Strauß (CSU), had ordered the arrest of five journalists for publishing a memo detailing alleged weaknesses in the German armed forces (known as the Spiegel scandal). In 1963 Adenauer finally retired; Ludwig Erhard took over his position as head of the coalition government.

Further reading

Notes

References

External links
 The Federal Returning Officer
 Psephos

Federal elections in Germany
1961 elections in Germany
Konrad Adenauer
1961 in West Germany
September 1961 events in Europe